River Esk is the name of:

United Kingdom

England 
River Esk, North Yorkshire (in Eskdale in the North York Moors National Park)
River Esk, Cumbria (in Eskdale in the Lake District)

Scotland 
River North Esk, Angus and Aberdeenshire
River South Esk, Angus
River Esk, Dumfries and Galloway, also known as the Border Esk (in Eskdale in Dumfries and Galloway)
River Esk, Lothian, which runs for much of its length as two separate tributaries, the North Esk and the South Esk

Australia
 Esk River (New South Wales), a tributary of the Clarence River 
 Esk River (Queensland)
 North Esk River a river in Tasmania, Australia
 South Esk River a river in Tasmania, Australia

New Zealand
Esk River (Canterbury), New Zealand
Esk River (Hawke's Bay), New Zealand

See also
North Esk (disambiguation)
South Esk (disambiguation)

de:Esk
it:Esk (fiume)